Tamamo-no-Mae (also ) is a legendary figure in Japanese mythology. One of the stories explaining the legend comes from Muromachi period genre fiction called otogizōshi. In the otogizōshi Tamamo-no-Mae was a courtesan under the Japanese Emperor Konoe (who reigned from 1142 through 1155).

Legends
Stories of Tamamo-no-Mae being a legendary fox spirit appear during the Muromachi period as otogizōshi (prose narratives), and were also mentioned by Toriyama Sekien in Konjaku Hyakki Shūi. Edo period folklore then conflated the legend with similar foreign stories about fox spirits corrupting rulers, causing chaos in their territories.

In the story told by Hokusai, formed in the Edo period, the nine-tailed fox first appeared in China and possessed Daji, a concubine of the Shang dynasty's last ruler King Zhou. She enchanted the king and brought on a reign of terror that led to a rebellion that ended the Shang dynasty. The fox spirit fled to Magadha of Tianzhu (ancient India) and became Lady Kayō, concubine of the crown prince Banzoku (based on Indian tales of Kalmashapada the man-eater), causing him to cut off the heads of a thousand men. It was then defeated again, and fled the country. Around 780 BC the same fox, returned to China, was said to have possessed Bao Si, a concubine of the Zhou dynasty King You. It was again chased away by human military forces.

The fox stayed quiet for some period. Then she appeared in Japan as Tamamo-no-Mae, the most favoured courtesan of Emperor Toba. She was said to be a most beautiful and intelligent woman, being able to answer any question asked. She caused the Emperor to be extremely ill and was eventually exposed as a fox spirit by the astrologer Abe no Yasuchika, who had been called to diagnose the cause of the Emperor's poor health. A few years later, the emperor sent Kazusa-no-suke and Miura-no-suke to kill the fox in the plains of Nasu.

In the 1653 Tamamo no sōshi, an addendum was added to the story describing that the spirit of Tamamo-no-mae embedded itself into a stone called the Sesshō-seki. The stone continually released poisonous gas, killing everything that touched it. The stone was said to have been destroyed in the Nanboku-chō period by the Buddhist monk Gennō Shinshō, who exorcised the now-repentant fox spirit. He held a Buddhist memorial service after the deed, allowing the spirit to finally rest in peace. 

The stone split in two on March 5, 2022. Cracks in the stone had been seen several years before the split, possibly allowing rainwater to penetrate and weaken it, so it is highly likely that the stone cracked naturally. Some humorously speculated that this had freed Tamamo-no-Mae, and social media in Japan predicted that dark forces had been released.

Notes

References

External links 
 

Literature featuring anthropomorphic foxes
Japanese folklore
Kitsune (fox)
Female legendary creatures